Suraj Govindaraj (born on 14 May 1973) is an additional judge of the High Court of Karnataka, and he took the oath on 23 September 2019 and was appointed as Permanent Judge on 1 March 2021.

He has practiced in the field of Civil, Commercial Litigation, Contracts, Property Law, Arbitration, Company Law, Intellectual Property Rights, Constitution Matters, Debt Recovery, Environmental Law, Revenue Matters under local land laws, Consumer Law, RERA among others.

References 

Judges of the Karnataka High Court
1973 births
Living people